was a town located in Kitamatsuura District, Nagasaki Prefecture, Japan.

As of January 1, 2009, the town had an estimated population of 5,115 and a density of 169 persons per km2. The total area was 30.24 km2.

On March 31, 2010, Shikamachi, along with the town of Emukae (also from Kitamatsuura District), was merged into the expanded city of Sasebo.

Shikamachi was founded as a town in 1947. Coal mining was formerly the most important industry in the area, until the coal mines closed in the 1960s. The economy is now centered on agriculture and fishing.

References

External links
 Sasebo official website 

Dissolved municipalities of Nagasaki Prefecture
Sasebo